Army Cadets may refer to:

 Army Cadet Force (UK)
 New Zealand Cadet Corps
 Royal Canadian Army Cadets
 Australian Army Cadets
 Corps of Cadets at the United States Military Academy
 Army Black Knights, formerly known as the Cadets